The 2022 Australian Open was a Grand Slam tennis tournament that took place at Melbourne Park, Australia from 17 to 30 January 2022. It was the 110th edition of the Australian Open, the 54th in the Open Era, and the first Grand Slam of the year. The tournament consisted of events for professional players in singles, doubles and mixed doubles. Junior and wheelchair players competed in singles and doubles tournaments. As in previous years, the tournament's main sponsor was Kia.

The men's singles title was won by Rafael Nadal, and was Nadal's 21st major title, and his second Australian Open. He defeated second seed Daniil Medvedev in the final, winning in five sets after being two sets down. In winning the title, Nadal broke the record for all-time men's major singles title - it was previously tied at 20 between himself, Novak Djokovic, and Roger Federer. The women's singles title was won by Ashleigh Barty, who won her first Australian Open title and third major title. She defeated 27th seed Danielle Collins in straight sets. Barty was the first Australian to win the title since Chris O'Neil won the title in 1978. The final would also prove to be Barty's last professional match, with Barty announcing her retirement in March 2022.

The event was overshadowed by Djokovic's battle with Australian immigration after disclosing he was not vaccinated against COVID-19. In the end, he was unable to participate after his visa was cancelled twice by Australian Immigration Minister Alex Hawke.

Tournament

The 2022 Australian Open was the 110th edition of the tournament, held at Melbourne Park in Melbourne, Victoria, Australia. The tournament returned to its traditional January slot after the 2021 tournament was held in February after a precaution over concerns with the strict COVID-19 protocols.

The tournament was run by the International Tennis Federation (ITF) and is part of the 2022 ATP Tour and the 2022 WTA Tour calendars under the Grand Slam category. The tournament consisted of both men's and women's singles and doubles draws as well as the mixed doubles events. There were singles and doubles events for both boys and girls (players under 18), which are part of the Grade A category of tournaments.  The junior competitions returned after a year of absence. There are also singles, doubles and quad events for men's and women's wheelchair tennis players as part of the NEC tour under the Grand Slam category.

The tournament was played on hard courts and took place across a series of 25 courts, including the four main show courts of Rod Laver Arena, John Cain Arena, Margaret Court Arena and 1573 Arena. It was also the debut of Kia Arena, which made for five main tennis arenas.

Singles players
 Men's singles

 Women's singles

Events

Men's singles

  Rafael Nadal def.  Daniil Medvedev, 2–6, 6–7(5–7), 6–4, 6–4, 7–5

Women's singles

  Ashleigh Barty def.  Danielle Collins, 6–3, 7–6(7–2)

Men's doubles

  Thanasi Kokkinakis /  Nick Kyrgios def.  Matthew Ebden /  Max Purcell, 7–5, 6–4

Women's doubles

  Barbora Krejčíková /  Kateřina Siniaková def.  Anna Danilina /  Beatriz Haddad Maia, 6–7(3–7), 6–4, 6–4

Mixed doubles

  Kristina Mladenovic /  Ivan Dodig def.  Jaimee Fourlis /  Jason Kubler, 6–3, 6–4

Wheelchair men's singles

  Shingo Kunieda def.  Alfie Hewett, 7–5, 3–6, 6–2

Wheelchair women's singles

  Diede de Groot def.  Aniek van Koot, 6–1, 6–1

Wheelchair quad singles

  Sam Schröder def.  Dylan Alcott, 7–5, 6–0

Wheelchair men's doubles

  Alfie Hewett /  Gordon Reid def.  Gustavo Fernández /  Shingo Kunieda, 6–2, 4–6, [10–7]

Wheelchair women's doubles

  Diede de Groot /  Aniek van Koot def.  Yui Kamiji /  Lucy Shuker, 7–5, 3–6, [10–2]

Wheelchair quad doubles

  Andy Lapthorne /  David Wagner def.  Sam Schröder /  Niels Vink, 2–6, 6–4, [10–7]

Boys' singles

  Bruno Kuzuhara def.  Jakub Menšík, 7–6(7–4), 6–7(6–8), 7–5

Girls' singles

  Petra Marčinko def.  Sofia Costoulas, 7–5, 6–1

Boys' doubles

  Bruno Kuzuhara /  Coleman Wong def.  Alex Michelsen /  Adolfo Daniel Vallejo, 6–3, 7–6(7–3)

Girls' doubles

  Clervie Ngounoue /  Diana Shnaider def.  Kayla Cross /  Victoria Mboko, 6–4, 6–3

Point distribution and prize money

Point distribution
Below is a series of tables for each of the competitions showing the ranking points offered for each event.

Senior points

Wheelchair points

Junior points

Prize money
The Australian Open total prize money for 2022 increased by 3.5% to a tournament record A$74,000,000.

Djokovic's vaccination and visa controversy
On 4 January 2022, defending champion Novak Djokovic announced that he could compete in the Australian Open after he had been granted medical exemption from mandatory COVID-19 vaccination by Tennis Australia and the health department of the state of Victoria, after a blind review of his application. However, the Australian Minister for Home Affairs, Karen Andrews, stated that regardless of Tennis Australia and Victoria's decision, Australia's border requirements would be still enforced by the federal government, namely that unvaccinated individuals entering Australia "must provide acceptable proof that they cannot be vaccinated for medical reasons".

On 5 January, Djokovic was detained by the Australian Border Force upon arriving in Australia and being determined to not meet the entry requirements for unvaccinated travellers. His lawyers requested an injunction against deportation in order to appeal the visa refusal; this allowed Djokovic to remain confined in a detention hotel pending the outcome of the appeal. On 10 January, the Federal Circuit and Family Court ruled against the government on procedural grounds, ordered his release from detention and directed the federal government to pay his legal expenses. The reason for the ruling was that when Djokovic was in immigration holding before his visa was cancelled, Australian officials reneged on an agreement to give Djokovic sufficient time to contact his lawyers and tennis authorities before his official interview; this led the Australian government to concede they treated Djokovic unreasonably.

Djokovic's travel declaration on entry to Australia erroneously stated that he had not travelled anywhere else in the previous 14 days. There was additional controversy due to his meetings with a photographer and children after he claimed to have tested positive, and discrepancies discovered in his COVID test documents, which he had hoped to use to obtain an exemption.

Twenty-five other players and staff had applied for a medical exemption and a handful of applications had been granted. Among those, two people with the same type of visa and exemption as Djokovic had reportedly been allowed into the country. Player Renata Voráčová was one of those granted an exemption and allowed into the country. She had participated in a warm-up tournament but was subsequently detained in the same hotel as Djokovic and deported on 8 January 2022. Filip Serdarusic, a tennis coach with the same exemption, was also allowed entry but left the country voluntarily.

Public opinion in Australia of an unvaccinated athlete being permitted to participate in an event that spectators could not attend unless fully vaccinated was overwhelmingly negative. Another concern was that Djokovic should not be given entry while many Australians remained stranded overseas due to the pandemic. A poll jointly published by newspapers The Herald Sun and The Age showed that 71% of respondents did not want Djokovic to be allowed to stay. The furore that unfolded in the media over the issue achieved worldwide attention.

On 14 January 2022, Alex Hawke, the Australian Minister for Immigration, Citizenship, Migrant Services and Multicultural Affairs, exercised his ministerial powers under sections 133C(3) and 116(1)(e)(i) of the Migration Act 1958 to cancel Djokovic's visa, citing "health and good order grounds, on the basis that it was in the public interest to do so". An application for review of the decision was made in the Federal Court, but was dismissed on 16 January, ruling out Djokovic's participation. Djokovic said he was "extremely disappointed" with the decision but accepted the ruling, and flew out of Australia that night. Salvatore Caruso, ranked 150 in the world, took his place in the draw as the "lucky loser".

References

External links

 Australian Open official website

 
 

 
2022 WTA Tour
2022 ATP Tour
2022 in Australian tennis
January 2022 sports events in Australia
COVID-19 pandemic in Australia
2022,Australian Open